The Side Effects of You Tour is the second headlining tour by American recording artist, Fantasia Barrino. Primarily visiting the United States and Barbados, the tour supported her fourth studio album, Side Effects of You. Before the tour commenced, Barrino served as the opening act for Andrea Bocelli's 2013 tour.

Opening acts
Raheem DeVaughn (New Orleans—July 4)
Avant (Miami)
Joe (Oak Grove)
Musiq Soulchild (St. Louis)
Toni Norville (Bridgetown)
112 (Charlotte)

Setlist
"I'm Doin' Me"
"Man of the House"
"Without Me" (contains excerpts from "Started from the Bottom")
"Free Yourself"
"Trust Him" 
"A Change Is Gonna Come"
"Collard Greens & Cornbread"
"Truth Is"
"Ain’t Gon' Beg You"
"Nasty Girl" / "In My House" / "The Bird"
"If I Was a Bird"
"When I See U"
"Bittersweet"
"Even Angels"
"In Deep"
"Get It Right"
"Ain't All Bad"
"It's All Good"
"Side Effects of You"
"Lose to Win"
"Lighthouse"

Tour dates

Festivals and other miscellaneous performances
This concert was a part of the "African American Festival"
This concert was a part of the "Foss Park District Festival—Concert in the Park"
This concert was a part of "JazzFest West"
This concert was a part of the "Macy's Music Festival"
This concert was a part of the "Tom Joyner Family Reunion"
This concert was a part of the "Gulf Coast Summer Fest"
This concert was a part of the "Labor Day Weekend R&B Explosion"
This concert was a part of the "Labor Day Picnic Jam"

Cancellations and rescheduled shows

Box office score data

External links
Fantasia Official Website

References

2013 concert tours
Fantasia Barrino concert tours